The Sound of Sleat is a narrow sea channel off the western coast of Scotland. It divides the Sleat peninsula on the south-east side of the Isle of Skye from Morar, Knoydart and Glenelg on the Scottish mainland.

It is widest at the south-west entrance and narrows to just  at Kyle Rhea, a narrow channel which connects the Sound through to Loch Alsh. The name is inherited from the peninsula to the north of the Sound, which derives its name from its Scottish Gaelic form Sléibhte (or Slèite), which in turn comes from Old Norse sléttr meaning smooth or even.

On the mainland side of the Sound are the entrances to Loch Nevis and Loch Hourn. The largest settlement on the mainland side is Mallaig which sits at the entrance to the Sound. On the Skye side of the Sound sit Knock Castle, a former stronghold of the MacDonalds, and the village of Armadale.

The Sound is traversed on a regular basis in the summer by a ferry operating between Glenelg and Kylerhea. A Caledonian MacBrayne ferry operates between Mallaig and Armadale throughout the year.

References

Sounds of Scotland
Landforms of Highland (council area)